Chakhmak may refer to:
Chakhmakh
Chakhmakh-Bina
Chakhmaq Chukhur
Chakhmaq Bolagh-e Sofla
Chakmak

Seo also
Chakhmakhly (disambiguation)